My Life in the Blues is an album by the blues musician Lightnin' Hopkins, recorded in late 1964 and released on the Prestige label the following year. The album contains Hopkins' performances interspersed with an interview conducted by Samuel Charters.

Reception
 
The Penguin Guide to Blues Recordings wrote that the album "contains half a dozen unremarkable performances taped at what sounds like a noisy party, and eight far more interesting passages of reminiscence in which Lightnin' describes his family, learning to play guitar, meeting Texas Alexander, making records and other topics". AllMusic's Ritchie Unterberger reviewed Straight Blues, which collected the six songs from the project, calling them: "typical Hopkins' performances, incorporating both narrative folky tunes with spoken introductions, and livelier boogies".

Track listing
All compositions by Sam "Lightnin'" Hopkins 
 I Growed Up with the Blues – 5:06
 "I Don't Want to Do Nothing to You" – 2:30
 My Family – 4:25
 "You Is One Black Rat" – 3:05
 I Learn About the Blues – 6:20
 "Got Nowhere to Lay My Head" – 6:25
 I First Come into Houston – 3:25
 "Just Boogyin'" – 2:15
 I Meet Texas Alexander – 5:15
 "Take Me Back" – 2:05
 They Was Hard Times – 6:10
 I Make My First Record and Get My Name – 6:35
 My Thoughts on the Blues – 5:30
 "I Was Down on Dowling Street" – 5:10

Personnel

Performance
Lightnin' Hopkins – guitar, vocals, narration

Production
Samuel Charters – producer
Rudy Van Gelder – engineer

References

Lightnin' Hopkins albums
1965 albums
Prestige Records albums
Albums recorded at Van Gelder Studio